Sergio Alejandro Blancas Hernández  (born 26 June 1988) is a Mexican footballer who plays as a forward for Deportivo Iztapa.

References

External links

1988 births
Living people
Association football forwards
C.F. Mérida footballers
Atlético Morelia players
Venados F.C. players
Tigres F.C. footballers
Deportivo Chiantla players
Liga MX players
Ascenso MX players
Liga Premier de México players
Categoría Primera B players
Liga Nacional de Fútbol de Guatemala players
Mexican expatriate footballers
Expatriate footballers in Colombia
Mexican expatriate sportspeople in Colombia
Expatriate footballers in Guatemala
Mexican expatriate sportspeople in Guatemala
Footballers from Michoacán
Mexican footballers